The Burundi Tribune is a newspaper published in Bujumbura, Burundi. The online version is published in French and English. It specializes in delivering news on politics, the economy, education and security.

External links
Stanford University's Library Listing

Newspapers published in Burundi